Donkey Kong Land III is a 1997 platform game in the Donkey Kong series for the Game Boy, later being ported to the Game Boy Color in Japan under the name . It was developed by Rare and published by Nintendo. Like its predecessors, Donkey Kong Land III served as the portable version of and follow-up to its SNES counterpart, in this case Donkey Kong Country 3: Dixie Kong's Double Trouble!, was enhanced for the Super Game Boy, and was packaged with a "banana yellow" cartridge.

Gameplay

Plot
A contest has begun with big prizes for the first person who discovers the Lost World. Donkey Kong and Diddy Kong have already left to find it, leaving a disgruntled Dixie Kong behind.  Deciding to prove herself every bit as capable as them, Dixie partners up with her toddler cousin Kiddy Kong. Baron K. Roolenstein and the Kremling Krew are also searching high and low for the fabled land. The level archetypes are the same as in Donkey Kong Country 3, which takes place in the "Northern Kremisphere". While the levels have the same environments and the Donkey Kong Country 3 bosses return, the worlds and stage layouts are all unique.

Wrinkly Kong is the only non-playable Kong family member to make an appearance. A character simply titled Bear or "Brother Bear" gives Dixie Kong and Kiddy Kong hints and can teleport them to another world as well as hosting a card mini-game. He bears a resemblance to Bazaar Bear from Donkey Kong Country 3. The Animal Buddies Ellie the Elephant, Enguarde the Swordfish, Squawks the Parrot, and Squitter the Spider all return. Donkey Kong Land III also marks the only time in a Rare Donkey Kong game where Donkey Kong does not actually appear.

Game Boy Color update
On 28 January 2000, over two years after the game's North American and European releases, Nintendo released an updated Game Boy Color version of the game in Japan. Titled Donkey Kong GB: Dinky Kong & Dixie Kong, it was not released outside of Japan. This version is the same as the Game Boy version, but lacks some animations and dialogues. This was also the version released on the Japanese 3DS Virtual Console in 2014.

Reception
Donkey Kong Land III received a score of 81.25% at GameRankings based on four reviews. Nintendojo praised the game and awarded it 8.5 out of 10, citing the "brilliantly designed" levels and "impressive" visuals. Nintendo Life gave the Virtual Console re-release 9 out of 10.

References

External links
  
 Official Nintendo 3DS eshop minisite 
 
 Donkey Kong Land III at NinDB

1997 video games
Donkey Kong platform games
Game Boy Color games
Game Boy games
Platform games
Rare (company) games
Video game sequels
Video games featuring female protagonists
Video games scored by Eveline Fischer Novakovic
Virtual Console games
Virtual Console games for Nintendo 3DS
Video games developed in the United Kingdom
Single-player video games